UFC 160: Velasquez vs. Bigfoot 2 was a mixed martial arts event held on May 25, 2013, at the MGM Grand Garden Arena in Las Vegas, Nevada.

Background
The main event was a rematch between former UFC Heavyweight Champion Cain Velasquez and Antônio Silva.  In their first encounter at UFC 146 a year earlier, Velasquez defeated Silva via first-round TKO.

Alistair Overeem was expected to face Junior dos Santos at the event.  However, in early March, Overeem pulled out of the bout citing a leg injury.  It was initially announced that the bout would be rescheduled for a future event, later in the summer of this year. Then, on March 9 it was announced that Dos Santos would remain on the card and face Mark Hunt.

Ryan Bader was expected to face Glover Teixeira at the event but withdrew from the bout due to injury in March. He was replaced by James Te Huna

Amir Sadollah was expected to face Stephen Thompson at the event.  However, Sadollah pulled out of the bout citing an injury and was replaced by Nah-Shon Burrell.

Gunnar Nelson was expected to face Mike Pyle at the event.  However, Nelson pulled out of the bout citing an injury and was replaced by Rick Story.

Dana White announced at the UFC on Fox 7 post-fight press conference that he expects that the winner of the Gray Maynard/T. J. Grant fight would get a UFC Lightweight title shot against Benson Henderson.

At the weigh-ins, Khabib Nurmagomedov came in heavy weighing in at 158.5 lb.  Nurmagomedov was given two hours to cut to the lightweight maximum of 156 pounds, but he elected instead to surrender a percentage of his fight purse to his opponent Abel Trujillo and the bout was contested at a catchweight.

Results

Bonus awards
The following fighters were awarded $50,000 bonuses.

 Fight of the Night: Junior Dos Santos vs. Mark Hunt
 Knockout of the Night: T. J. Grant
 Submission of the Night: Glover Teixeira

Reported payout

The following is the reported payout to the fighters as reported to the Nevada State Athletic Commission. It does not include sponsor money and also does not include the UFC's traditional "fight night" bonuses.
 Cain Velasquez: $400,000 (no win bonus) def. Antonio Silva: $75,000
 Junior dos Santos: $240,000 (includes $120,000 win bonus) def. Mark Hunt: $160,000
 Glover Teixeira: $48,000 (includes $24,000 win bonus) def. James Te-Huna: $30,000
 T. J. Grant: $50,000 (includes $25,000 win bonus) def. Gray Maynard: $45,000
 Donald Cerrone: $82,000 (includes $41,000 win bonus) def. K. J. Noons: $41,000
 Mike Pyle: $84,000 (includes $42,000 win bonus) def. Rick Story: $27,000
 Dennis Bermudez: $28,000 (includes $14,000 win bonus) def. Max Holloway: $14,000
 Robert Whittaker: $30,000 (includes $15,000 win bonus) def. Colton Smith: $15,000
 Khabib Nurmagomedov: $28,000 (includes $14,000 win bonus) def. Abel Trujillo: $8,000 ^
 Stephen Thompson: $16,000 (includes $8,000 win bonus) def. Nah-Shon Burrell: $9,000
 George Roop: $26,000 (includes $13,000 win bonus ) def. Brian Bowles: $19,000
 Jeremy Stephens: $48,000 (includes $24,000 win bonus) def. Estevan Payan: $10,000

^ Khabib Nurmagomedov was reportedly fined 20 percent of his purse for failing to make the required weight for his fight. The Nevada State Athletic Commission's initial report did not include information on the penalty.

See also
List of UFC events
2013 in UFC

References

External links
Official UFC past events page
UFC events results at Sherdog.com

Ultimate Fighting Championship events
2013 in mixed martial arts
Mixed martial arts in Las Vegas
2013 in sports in Nevada
MGM Grand Garden Arena